West Estonian archipelago (also Moonsund archipelago) is a group of Estonian islands located in the Baltic Sea around Väinameri. The archipelago is composed of the islands Saaremaa, Hiiumaa, Muhu, Vormsi and about 900 other smaller islands.

Protected areas

UNESCO established the West Estonian Archipelago Biosphere Reserve in 1990 under the Man and the Biosphere Programme.

See also
List of islands of Estonia
Estonian Swedes

References

External links
The Väinameri Sea Estonica

Archipelagoes of the Baltic Sea
•
Biosphere reserves of Estonia
Gulf of Riga